"Les Sucettes" ("Lollipops") is a French pop song written by Serge Gainsbourg and first recorded by France Gall in 1966. One of Gall's biggest hits, it was an unusually risqué song for its time, although she has said she was unaware of the fact when performing it.

Meaning
"Les Sucettes" is, on the surface, a yé-yé-style song about a girl named Annie who likes aniseed-flavoured lollipops; much of the lyrical content plays up the homonyms of "Annie" and "anis" (aniseed).

But Gainsbourg's lyric also contains double meanings referring to oral sex, such as a line about barley sugar running down Annie's throat. The very noun for lollipop in French, "sucette", is the substantivised verb "sucer", sucking – so that the title and the refrain ("Annie aime les sucettes", Annie loves lollipops) are far more evocative in French than in the English translation. A possible translation to preserve the innuendo would be "Annie loves suckers". The song also features a direct double entendre, stating that Annie has lollipops "pour quelques pennies" (for a few pennies), which can also be heard as "pour quelques pénis" (for a few penises).

Music video
A film clip for the song was directed by Jean-Christophe Averty for the TV show Au risque de vous plaire (lit. "At the Risk of Pleasing You"). It featured props playing on the sexual references, with lollipops that were somewhat phallic rather than the traditional circle shape, interspersed with cutaways of young women suggestively sucking on lollipops.

Another video was filmed, featuring Gall herself in a schoolgirl uniform inside a house, singing the song.

Reaction
Gall has said that she did not understand the double meaning of the song when she recorded it at age 18. By Gall's account, she did not realize until later why the filming of the clip attracted so many visitors to the set.

Upon its release, the song was a success in France and Belgium. In France, it entered the charts at #30 on July 15 and by the following week, it had climbed to its peak of #9.

Gall was said to be extremely upset upon finally learning the truth about the song's double meaning — "mortified, hiding herself away for weeks, refusing to face anyone". Gall said that she had sung Gainsbourg's songs "with an innocence of which I'm proud. I was pained to then learn that he had turned the situation to his advantage, mocking me."

In a 2001 television interview, Gall said that she felt "betrayed by the adults around me."

Gainsbourg called the song "the most daring song of the century" in an interview with the magazine Rock and Folk.

Charts

Covers

Kim Kay version

Belgian Eurodance singer Kim Kay recorded a cover of "Les Sucettes" that released in 2000 on EMI as the fourth single and as well as the opening track from her only compilation album, Hits! (2000). The single was produced by Phil Sterman and Lov Cook.

Track listing

Other covers
 Gainsbourg recorded his own version, with a psychedelic arrangement, on the 1969 album Jane Birkin/Serge Gainsbourg.
 The song was performed by Luce as a contestant on the eighth season of the French TV singing competition Nouvelle Star in 2010.
 The song was covered by the Swedish symphonic metal band Therion in the album Les Fleurs du Mal, released in September 2012.

See also
France Gall
Serge Gainsbourg

References

External links
 
 
 
 

1966 songs
1966 singles
France Gall songs
Kim Kay songs
Fellatio
Songs written by Serge Gainsbourg
Philips Records singles
EMI Records singles
French-language songs
Obscenity controversies in music